Bolingbroke, founded in 1867, is an unincorporated community and census-designated place (CDP) in Monroe County, Georgia, United States. It lies just north of Macon, between Interstates 475 and 75. The community is part of the Macon Metropolitan Statistical Area.

It was first listed as a CDP in the 2020 census, with a population of 497.

History
The community was named after Henry St John, 1st Viscount Bolingbroke (1678–1751), English philosopher and politician. Georgia General Assembly incorporated the town in 1912. Bolingbroke was dissolved as a municipality in 1995.

Geography
Bolingbroke is located in the southeastern part of Monroe County in between I-75 and I-475.

Demographics

2020 census

Note: the US Census treats Hispanic/Latino as an ethnic category. This table excludes Latinos from the racial categories and assigns them to a separate category. Hispanics/Latinos can be of any race.

Events
The Bolingbroke Southern Jam music festival has been produced here since 2009. There is an annual Christmas parade.

References

Census-designated places in Monroe County, Georgia
Macon metropolitan area, Georgia